Flashdance is a 1983 American romantic drama dance film.

Flashdance may also refer to:

Flashdance (soundtrack), soundtrack to the 1983 film
"Flashdance... What a Feeling", film's title song by Irene Cara
Flashdance (musical), 2008 stage musical
"Flashdance" (song), 2004 single by Deep Dish
Flash dance, acrobatic form of jazz dance
Flash Dance, NATO codename for the Soviet/Russian radar N007 Zaslon